William Otway may refer to:
 William Beauclerc Otway, merchant, mineralogist, gold-miner and quartz-crusher
 William Otway (cricketer), English cricketer

See also
 Loftus William Otway, British Army general